Link-local may refer to:

 Data link layer, the second layer of the OSI model of computer networking
 Link-local address, a computer network address